Diplotaxis fimbriata is a species of May beetle or junebug in the family Scarabaeidae. It is found in Central America and North America.

References

Further reading

 
 
 

Melolonthinae
Beetles described in 1909